Nima Mokhtari is an Iranian football forward who currently plays for Iranian football club in the Persian Gulf Pro League.

References

1998 births
Association football forwards
Iranian footballers
Living people
Gostaresh Foulad F.C. players
People from Tonekabon
Sportspeople from Mazandaran province
21st-century Iranian people